Kuczaba is a mountain in the Owl Mountains, part of Central Sudetes. Its height is 654 meters. It lies in Owl Mountains Landscape Park.

The mountain located next to Jodłownik in Dzierżoniów County, Lower Silesian Voivodeship, in south-western Poland.

Mountains of Poland